The Old Neighborhood is a play in three parts by David Mamet. It was performed at the Booth Theatre in November 1997.

References

1997 plays
Broadway plays
Plays by David Mamet